Gurski and Gursky are phonetic transliterations of the Polish-language surname Górski. Notable people with these surnames include:

 Andreas Gursky (born 1955), German photographer and professor
 Louisa Gurski (born 1988), London 2012 Olympic Games finalist
 Michael Gurski (born 1979), German football coach and former goalkeeper
 Olga Gurski (1902-1975), Ukrainian painter.
 Roger Gurski, German athlete 
 Yuri Gurski (born 1983), Belarusian IT entrepreneur

Fictional people
Solomon Gursky from Solomon Gursky Was Here

Polish-language surnames